John Jardine (September 24, 1854 – October 15, 1937) was a Scottish-born joiner, decorator and political figure in British Columbia. He represented Esquimalt from 1907 to 1912 in the Legislative Assembly of British Columbia as a Liberal.

Biography
He was born in Lockerbie, the son of John Jardine and Janet Montgomery, and educated in Dryfesdale. Jardine apprenticed as a house painter with his older brother Thomas for five years and then continued to work at that trade in Scotland for about three more years. He moved to St. Paul, Minnesota in 1880. In the same year, he married Jane King Stoddart. Jardine stayed in Minnesota until 1884, when he moved to Victoria, British Columbia. He owned a ranch on the British Columbia Electric Railway near Langley. The Jardine station was named in his honour. However, he lived in Esquimalt.

Jardine was an unsuccessful candidate for a seat in the assembly in 1903. He was defeated when he ran for reelection in 1912. He served as a member of the Royal Commission on Labour. Jardine was also a member of the local board of trade.

He died in Esquimalt at the age of 83.

References

External links
 

1854 births
1937 deaths
British Columbia Liberal Party MLAs
House painters